Adam James Barton (born 7 January 1991) is a professional footballer who plays as a central midfielder for Curzon Ashton.

Born in England, he has played internationally for both Northern Ireland, in a senior friendly, and Republic of Ireland at under-21 level.

Club career

Preston North End
Born in Clitheroe, Barton started in the youth ranks at Blackburn Rovers before being released at the age of sixteen due to a serious back injury. Although originally seen as a gamble due to his injury, Preston North End gave Barton a youth scholarship and his performances at youth and reserve team level earned him a two-and-a-half-year contract in December 2008.

In the 2009–10 season, Barton moved to Conference National side Crawley Town on a one-month loan. After making two appearances for the club he returned to Preston, where he made an appearance in the club's reserve side. Due to manager Darren Ferguson starting to use youngsters in the first team, Barton made his full debut in a home 3–2 win over Scunthorpe United on 10 April 2010, being replaced at half-time due to a head injury.

At the start of the 2010–11 season, Barton signed a two-year contract to keep him at Preston until 2013. He scored his first goal in the 4–3 defeat to Burnley in September 2010. After scoring his first goal, Barton established himself in the first team, where he made thirty-five appearances in all competitions, scoring once. However, Barton was unable to help the club avoid relegation to League One.

Ahead of the 2011–12 season, Barton was linked with Wolverhampton Wanderers and Blackburn Rovers. Despite this, newly appointed manager Phil Brown said he believed Barton could be a key figure to the club this season, quoting: "That is the position for him, sitting in front of the back four and making us play, like an orchestra leader. He has got that ability but he has to demand the ball and get on it more times." However, Barton's season didn't go as planned, as he mostly spent time on the bench at the start of the season. He scored his first goal of the season, in the League Cup Third Round, in a 2–1 loss against Southampton.

On 25 February 2012, Barton suffered a suspected triple leg break and a dislocated ankle in a 0–0 draw against Walsall after making a challenge with Walsall's Richard Taundry. As a result of his injury, new Preston manager Graham Westley said he believed Barton would come back stronger once he had recovered, while Taundry said he believed the tackle was innocuous, though he wished Barton a speedy recovery. Following surgery Barton was ruled out for the remainder of the season.

Coventry City
On 6 August 2012, Barton signed a three-year contract with Coventry City. He made his league debut for the club, in the opening game of the season as Coventry drew 1–1 with Yeovil Town. Three weeks after signing for the club, he scored his first goal, in a 2–2 draw against Bury. He finished the season with 3 goals in 22 League games.

On 27 March 2014, Barton joined League Two side Fleetwood Town on loan for the remainder of the 2013–14 season. After making 27 League appearances for Coventry in the 2014–15 season, he was released by the club at the end of the season.

Portsmouth
On 24 June 2015 Barton signed a two-year deal with Portsmouth.

Partick Thistle
Barton signed for Scottish Premiership club Partick Thistle on 31 August 2016, moving for an undisclosed transfer fee. He scored his first Partick Thistle goal in a 2–1 home defeat to Aberdeen, scoring a header from a corner into the top left corner of the goal. He was also awarded Man of the Match for his performance. On 9 November 2016, Barton was named as Premiership Player of the Month for October 2016. In the same month Barton also won Partick Thistle's McCrea Financial Services Player of the Month award as voted for by the Partick Thistle supporters. Barton scored his second Thistle goal in a 1–0 away win over St Johnstone in the Scottish Cup. In May 2017 Barton was named the club's player of the Year in his first season with Thistle.

Dundee United
Following Partick Thistle's relegation from the Premiership, Barton signed a two-year contract with Scottish Championship club Dundee United in July 2018.

Connah's Quay Nomads (loan)
In January 2019 he switched to the Welsh Premier League signing on loan for Connah's Quay Nomads.

Wrexham
On 4 July 2019, Barton signed for Wrexham on a two-year deal. Barton left Wrexham in February 2020 having made 10 appearances in all competitions.

Farsley Celtic
On 18 December 2020, Barton moved to National League North club Farsley Celtic.

Curzon Ashton
In November 2021 he joined Curzon Ashton.

International career
Barton was named in a Northern Ireland squad in September 2010, having previously been named in an under-21 squad, qualifying for the country through his parents. He withdrew from the squad the day after its announcement, in order to remain eligible for the England team, which would have no longer been the case had he represented Northern Ireland in a competitive fixture. On 12 November 2010 Barton was called up for Northern Ireland's friendly against Morocco after a number of withdrawals, playing the full 90 minutes in the 1–1 draw on 17 November.

On 15 March 2011, more question marks over Barton's international status were raised when he was called up to Noel King's Republic of Ireland under-21 squad for a friendly match against Portugal, making his debut appearance and playing the full 90 minutes for them in that game on 26 March 2011.

Career statistics

Honours

Individual
 Scottish Premiership Player of the Month (1): October 2016

References

External links

Republic of Ireland profile at Soccer Scene

1991 births
Living people
People from Clitheroe
Republic of Ireland association footballers
Republic of Ireland under-21 international footballers
Association footballers from Northern Ireland
Northern Ireland international footballers
English footballers
English people of Irish descent
English people of Northern Ireland descent
Association football midfielders
Preston North End F.C. players
Crawley Town F.C. players
Coventry City F.C. players
Fleetwood Town F.C. players
Portsmouth F.C. players
Partick Thistle F.C. players
Dundee United F.C. players
Connah's Quay Nomads F.C. players
Wrexham A.F.C. players
Farsley Celtic F.C. players
Curzon Ashton F.C. players
English Football League players
Cymru Premier players
National League (English football) players
Scottish Professional Football League players